Auja may refer to:
Auja al-Hafir, an ancient road junction in the Negev Desert on the border of modern Israel and Egypt
Al-Awja, a village near Tikrit, Iraq
Auja river, the Arabic name of the Yarkon River of Israel
al-Auja, Jericho, a Palestinian village north of Jericho named after Wadi Auja
Wadi Auja, valley and stream on the West Bank